A spermatophyte, also known as phanerogam (taxon Phanerogamae) or phaenogam (taxon Phaenogamae), is any plant that produces seeds, hence the alternative name seed plant. Spermatophytes are a subset of the embryophytes or land plants. They include most familiar types of plants, including all flowers and most trees, but exclude some other types of plants such as ferns, mosses, algae.

The term phanerogams or phanerogamae is derived from the Greek , meaning "visible", in contrast to the cryptogamae, together with the suffix , meaning "to marry". These terms distinguished those plants with hidden sexual organs (cryptogamae) from those with visible sexual organs (phanerogamae).

Description

The extant spermatophytes form five divisions, the first four of which are traditionally grouped as Gymnosperms, plants that have unenclosed, "naked seeds":

 Cycadophyta, the cycads, a subtropical and tropical group of plants,
 Ginkgophyta, which includes a single living species of tree in the genus Ginkgo,
 Pinophyta, the conifers, which are cone-bearing trees and shrubs, and
 Gnetophyta, the gnetophytes, various woody plants in the relict genera Ephedra, Gnetum, and Welwitschia.

The fifth extant division is the flowering plants, also known as angiosperms or magnoliophytes, the largest and most diverse group of spermatophytes:
 Angiosperms, the flowering plants, possess seeds enclosed in a fruit, unlike gymnosperms.

In addition to the five living taxa listed above, the fossil record contains evidence of many extinct taxa of seed plants, among those:
 Pteridospermae, the so-called "seed ferns", were one of the earliest successful groups of land plants, and forests dominated by seed ferns were prevalent in the late Paleozoic.
 Glossopteris was the most prominent tree genus in the ancient southern supercontinent of Gondwana during the Permian period.
By the Triassic period, seed ferns had declined in ecological importance, and representatives of modern gymnosperm groups were abundant and dominant through the end of the Cretaceous, when the angiosperms radiated.

Evolutionary history

This gave rise to a series of evolutionary changes that resulted in the origin of seed plants.

A middle Devonian (385-million-year-old) precursor to seed plants from Belgium has been identified predating the earliest seed plants by about 20 million years. Runcaria, small and radially symmetrical, is an integumented megasporangium surrounded by a cupule. The megasporangium bears an unopened distal extension protruding above the mutlilobed integument. It is suspected that the extension was involved in anemophilous (wind) pollination. Runcaria sheds new light on the sequence of character acquisition leading to the seed. Runcaria has all of the qualities of seed plants except for a solid seed coat and a system to guide the pollen to the seed.

Relationships and nomenclature

Seed-bearing plants are a subclade of the vascular plants (tracheophytes) and were traditionally divided into angiosperms, or flowering plants, and gymnosperms, which includes the gnetophytes, cycads, ginkgo, and conifers. Older morphological studies believed in a close relationship between the gnetophytes and the angiosperms, in particular based on vessel elements. However, molecular studies (and some more recent morphological and fossil papers) have generally shown a clade of gymnosperms, with the gnetophytes in or near the conifers. For example, one common proposed set of relationships is known as the gne-pine hypothesis and looks like:

However, the relationships between these groups should not be considered settled.

Other classifications group all the seed plants in a single division, with classes for the five groups:
Division Spermatophyta
Cycadopsida, the cycads
Ginkgoopsida, the ginkgo
Pinopsida, the conifers, ("Coniferopsida")
Gnetopsida, the gnetophytes
Magnoliopsida, the flowering plants, or Angiospermopsida

A more modern classification ranks these groups as separate divisions (sometimes under the Superdivision Spermatophyta):
Cycadophyta, the cycads
Ginkgophyta, the ginkgo
Pinophyta, the conifers
Gnetophyta, the gnetophytes
Magnoliophyta, the flowering plants

An alternative phylogeny of spermatophytes based on the work by Novíkov & Barabaš-Krasni 2015 with plant taxon authors from Anderson, Anderson & Cleal 2007 showing the relationship of extinct clades.

Unassigned spermatophytes:
 †Avatiaceae Anderson & Anderson 2003
 †Axelrodiopsida Anderson & Anderson
 †Alexiales Anderson & Anderson 2003
 †Hamshawviales Anderson & Anderson 2003
 †Hexapterospermales Doweld 2001
 †Hlatimbiales Anderson & Anderson 2003
 †Matatiellales Anderson & Anderson 2003
 †Petriellales Taylor et al. 1994
 †Arberiopsida Doweld 2001
 †Czekanowskiales Taylor et al. 2008
 †Iraniales E. Taylor et al. 2008
 †Vojnovskyales E. Taylor et al. 2008
 †Hermanophytales E. Taylor et al. 2008
 †Dirhopalostachyaceae E. Taylor et al. 2008

References

Bibliography 

 , in 
 
 

Superphyla
Devonian first appearances
Plants